Imrich Stacho (4 November 1931, in Trnava – 10 January 2006) was a Slovak football goalkeeper. He played for Czechoslovakia national team in 23 matches and scored one goal from a penalty in a match against Ireland.

He was a participant at the 1954 FIFA World Cup and 1958 FIFA World Cup.

Stacho played mostly for Spartak Trnava. During his military service in Prague, he played for Tankista Praha.

International goals

Source: 11v11

References 

  Zomrel legendárny brankár Imrich Stacho
  ČMFS entry

1931 births
2006 deaths
Slovak footballers
Czechoslovak footballers
FC Spartak Trnava players
1954 FIFA World Cup players
1958 FIFA World Cup players
Association football goalkeepers
Czechoslovakia international footballers
Dukla Prague footballers
Sportspeople from Trnava